Gmina Goleszów is a rural gmina (administrative district) in Cieszyn County, Silesian Voivodeship, in southern Poland, in the historical region of Cieszyn Silesia. Its seat is the village of Goleszów.

Neighbouring gminas
Gmina Goleszów is bordered by the gminas of Cieszyn, Dębowiec, Skoczów and Ustroń. It also borders the Czech Republic.

Twin towns – sister cities

Gmina Goleszów is twinned with:
 Bystřice, Czech Republic
 Reiskirchen, Germany
 Vendryně, Czech Republic

References

External links
 Official website

Goleszow
Cieszyn County
Cieszyn Silesia